Montagnac-sur-Auvignon is a commune in the Lot-et-Garonne department in south-western France.

The commune is about 17km south west of Agen and a similar distance east of Barbaste.

See also
Communes of the Lot-et-Garonne department

References

Montagnacsurauvignon